Ángel Valentín de las Heras Lázaro  (born 18 September 1958 in Zamora) is a retired Spanish sprinter who competed in the 200 and 400 metres. He represented his country at the 1984 and 1992 Summer Olympics as well as two World Championships, in 1983 and 1987.

International competitions

1Representing Europe
2Extra race

Personal bests
Outdoor
200 metres – 20.95 (+0.2 m/s, Granada 1988)
400 metres – 45.54 (Milano 1984)
Indoor
200 metres – 21.71 (Milano 1982)
400 metres – 46.57 (Budapest 1983)

References

All-Athletics profile

1958 births
Living people
Spanish male sprinters
Athletes (track and field) at the 1984 Summer Olympics
Athletes (track and field) at the 1992 Summer Olympics
Olympic athletes of Spain
People from Zamora, Spain
Sportspeople from the Province of Zamora
Mediterranean Games bronze medalists for Spain
Mediterranean Games medalists in athletics
Athletes (track and field) at the 1979 Mediterranean Games
Athletes (track and field) at the 1983 Mediterranean Games